The 2011 Formula Renault 2.0 UK Championship is a multi-event motor racing championship for open wheel, formula racing cars held across England. The championship features a mix of professional motor racing teams and privately funded drivers competing in 2 litre Formula Renault single seat race cars that conform to the technical regulations for the championship. It forms part of the extensive program of support categories built up around the BTCC centrepiece. This season will be the 23rd British Formula Renault Championship.

The season began at Brands Hatch on 3 April and ended on 16 October at Silverstone, after twenty rounds held in England. From the World Series meeting at Silverstone, the series was sponsored by Certina Kurth Frères and presented as the CERTINA Formula Renault 2.0 UK Championship.

Teams and drivers

Race calendar and results
The series will support the British Touring Car Championship at all rounds except Knockhill, as Formula Renault forms part of the World Series by Renault meeting two weeks earlier, at Silverstone. All races were held in United Kingdom.

Championship standings

Drivers' Championship
 Points were awarded on a 32-28-25-22-20-18-16-14-12-11-10-9-8-7-6-5-4-3-2-1 basis, with 2 points for fastest lap. A driver's 18 best results counted towards the championship.

Entrants' Championship

Formula Renault UK Finals Series
The 2011 Protyre Formula Renault UK Finals Series  will be the 14th British Formula Renault Winter Series and the first season under the new name of the Formula Renault UK Finals Series. The series will commence at Snetterton on 5–6 November and end at Rockingham on 12 November, after six races at three rounds held in England.

Teams and drivers

Calendar

Championship standings

References

External links
 The official website of the Formula Renault UK Championship

Formula Renault UK
UK
Renault 2.0 UK